A pentamer is an entity composed of five sub-units.

In chemistry, it applies to molecules made of five monomers.

In biochemistry, it applies to macromolecules, in particular to pentameric proteins, made of five proteic sub-units.

In microbiology, a pentamer is one of the proteins composing the polyhedral protein shell that encloses the bacterial micro-compartments known as carboxysomes.

In immunology, an MHC pentamer is a reagent used to detect antigen-specific CD8+ T cells.

See also

 penta prefix
 -mer suffix
 Pentamerous Metamorphosis, an album by Global Communication
 Pentamery (botany), having five parts in a distinct whorl of a plant structure
 Pentamerous can also refer to animals, such as crinoids

Oligomers